Gwa is a village in Kawa Township of Bago Region, Myanmar.

References

Populated places in Bago Region